"So Sad (Fade)" is the debut single by British rock band Love Amongst Ruin. The single was released on 30 August 2010 on Ancient B Records.

Reception
The single received generally positive reviews. AAA Music described the song as "an angry tune boosting a QOTSA sound alike intro, made of sharp guitars", while ATTN:Magazine said "all in all this is a promising start, and vocalist Steve Hewitt has done well to avoid sounding too much like Placebo." God Is in the TV gave the single 3/5.

Track listings
CD single
 "So Sad (Fade)"
 "Love Song"
 "So Sad (Fade) (Murdered by Killers #2)"

7"
 "So Sad (Fade)"
 "So Sad (Fade) (Murdered by Killers #2)"

7" (Limited Edition)
 "So Sad (Fade)"
 "Love Song"

Amazon exclusive
 "So Sad (Fade) (Acoustic)"

Credits
Steve Hewitt – vocals, drums, bass, guitar, piano
Jon Thorne – bass, guitar, Logic, string arrangements
Nick Hewitt – guitar
Donald Ross Skinner – guitar, bass, piano

References

2010 debut singles
Love Amongst Ruin songs
Songs written by Steve Hewitt
2010 songs